Tonale Pass (el. 1883 m./6178 ft.) is a high mountain pass in northern Italy across the Rhaetian Alps, between Lombardy and Trentino.

It connects Valcamonica and Val di Sole. It is delimited by the Ortler Alps to the north and the  Adamello range to the south.

The pass has hotels and shops for tourists in winter, as the land around the pass is used for winter sports – mainly skiing (see Adamello Ski Raid) and snowboarding.

During World War I the place was heavily fought for between Italians holding Western side (Lombardy) and the troops of Habsburg Empire holding the Eastern side (Trentino). A memorial for the fallen Italian soldiers was erected during the fascist period.

See also
 List of highest paved roads in Europe
 List of mountain passes
 Tonalite

External links
 
 Profile on climbbybike.com

Mountain passes of the Alps
Mountain passes of Italy
Province of Brescia